Composite Truth is the third album by the Brooklyn-based soul/funk band Mandrill. Released in January 1973 on Polydor Records, the album reached No. 8 on the Billboard Top Soul Albums chart.

Track listing 
All songs written and arranged by Mandrill

"Hang Loose" 	4:45 	
"Fencewalk" 	5:28 	
"Hágalo" 	2:47 	
"Don't Mess With People" 	3:45 	
"Polk Street Carnival" 	6:03 	
"Golden Stone" 	7:17 	
"Out With The Boys" 	5:09 	
"Moroccan Nights" 	5:42

Personnel 
Carlos Wilson - trombone, alto saxophone, flute, guitar, vocals
Louis Wilson - trumpet, flugelhorn, percussion, vocals
Ricardo Wilson - tenor saxophone, percussion, vocals
Claude "Coffee" Cave - keyboards, vibraphone, percussion, vocals
Frederick "Fudgie Kae" Solomon - bass, percussion, vocals
Omar Mesa - guitar, percussion, vocals
Neftali Santiago - drums, percussion, vocals

Charts

Singles

References

External links
 Mandrill-Composite Truth at Discogs

1973 albums
Mandrill (band) albums
Polydor Records albums
Albums recorded at Electric Lady Studios